Akhilesh Sheshmani Dubey (born 5 June 1978) is an Advocate and Solicitor practising in Mumbai. Dubey is a University of Mumbai and a University of London graduate and is also admitted as a Solicitor to the Superior Courts of England and Wales and is a member of the Law Society of England and Wales. He has represented several high-profile cases including Dilip Chhabria, Peter Kerkar, Kirit Somaiya, etc.

Professional Works 
Dilip Chhabria was represented by Dubey in the Avanti case and case filed by comedian Kapil Sharma. While appearing for Dilip Chhabria at the time of his arrest in the Avanti case, Akhilesh Dubey defended him by arguing that the case was registered at the behest of Kiran Kumar of Lalita Jewellers, Dilip Chhabria’s partner, who was trying to arm-twist him. As he appeared for Peter Kerkar, the CEO of Cox & Kings Ltd., Akhilesh Dubey argued that the PwC report on Cox & Kings specified that it does not have the right or authority to determine or conclude any transaction constituting/amounting to fraud/fraudulent activity. Whether a particular transaction is fraudulent or not in its legal parlance is a matter of legal and judicial interpretation, inference, judgment, and adjudication, which can be determined, ascertained, and adjudicated only by an appropriate judicial or quasi-judicial body authorized under the applicable extant laws.

Dubey has defended Godlike esports and Jonathan Gaming against Loco (an esports platform) and is also involved in creating awareness about legislating online gaming in India. He has represented BJP Politician Kirit Somaiya in cases filed against erstwhile ministers in Maha Vikas Aghadi Government, Anil Parab, and Hasan Mushrif. In February 2022, Kirit Somaiya attacked the then Mahavikas Aghadi Government by releasing a list of "Dirty Dozens." Somaiya's plea filed through Dubey sought initiation of "necessary action" against Ratnagiri District Collector and Sub-divisional officer of Dapoli for "filing a false and misleading affidavit" before the High Court to help the erstwhile Minister Anil Parab. Somaiya's plea against Sadanand Kadam, allegedly a close aide of former Maharashtra Cabinet Minister Anil Parab, filed before the Bombay High Court through Dubey said it was the BJP leader's de facto complaint against illegal construction that led to all proceedings against Kadam.

Dubey is an author at The Daily Guardian newspaper, where his articles are regularly published on op-ed pages. His scholarly papers are published on renowned repositories like SSRN. He is also a writer and columnist who writes regularly in print media about legal developments.

References